"She's Pulling Me Back Again" is a song written by Bill Rice and Jerry Foster, and recorded by American country music artist Mickey Gilley.  It was released in February 1977 as the first single from the album First Class.  The song was Gilley's seventh number one on the country chart.  The single stayed at number one for a single week and spent a total of thirteen weeks on the country chart.

Charts

Weekly charts

Year-end charts

References
 

Mickey Gilley songs
1977 singles
Songs written by Bill Rice
Song recordings produced by Eddie Kilroy
Playboy Records singles
Songs written by Jerry Foster
1977 songs